1954 Emperor's Cup Final was the 34th final of the Emperor's Cup competition. The final was played at Yamanashi Prefectural Stadium in Yamanashi on May 25, 1954. Keio BRB won the championship.

Overview
Keio BRB won the championship, by defeating Toyo Industries 5–3.

Match details

See also
1954 Emperor's Cup

References

Emperor's Cup
Emperor's Cup Final
Emperor's Cup Final
Sanfrecce Hiroshima matches